The 1998–99 Australian Baseball League season was the 10th season of the original Australian Baseball League, contested between six teams representing state and regional capitals: , , , ,  and . The championship was won by the Gold Coast Cougars, who defeated the Sydney Storm in 2 games in the championship series at the Sydney Showground Stadium. The Adelaide Giants finished the season on top of the ladder but were knocked out in Semi-final 1 by the Sydney Storm.

All play-off games in the 1998–99 ABL season were held at the then-recently completed Sydney Showground, which was to become the main venue for baseball at the 2000 Summer Olympics.

1998–99 was the final season of the original Australian Baseball League. At the completion of the season the rights to the league were purchased by Dave Nilsson who then attempted to form the International Baseball League of Australia.

Teams

Only 6 of the 8 teams from the previous season returned, The Hunter Eagles and Brisbane Bandits were both unable to continue in the league due to increasing financial pressure.

Rosters 
During the regular season each team made use of an active roster of 22–24 men, with a maximum of 4 import players.

Adelaide Giants

Melbourne Monarchs

Melbourne Reds

Sydney Storm

Venues

Match results

Top 10 Stats

Postseason

Finals series at Sydney Showground Stadium
The 1999 Postseason was held at the newly constructed Sydney Showground Stadium, The Showgrounds Stadium was to be the main venue for Baseball at the Sydney 2000 Olympics.

The Postseason followed a 3-game Semi-final playoff format, 1st vs 4th and 2nd vs 3rd. The winners of the two Semi-finals series then played off in a 3-game Championship series.

Semi-final 1: 1st vs 4th

Game 1: 10 February 1999

Game 2: 10 February 1999

Semi-final 2: 2nd vs 3rd

Game 1: 11 February 1999

Game 2: 11 February 1999

Championship Series at Sydney Showground Stadium

Game 1: 12 February 1999

Game 2: 12 February 1999

Awards

All-Star Team

References

Australian Baseball League (1989–1999) seasons
1998 in Australian baseball
1999 in Australian baseball